Poe Paddy State Park is a  Pennsylvania state park in Haines Township, Centre County, Pennsylvania in the United States. The park is surrounded by Bald Eagle State Forest. The park is at the confluence of Big Poe Creek and Penns Creek. Poe Paddy State Park is named for the two mountains that surround it. Poe Mountain lies to the east and Paddy Mountain lies to the west, with Penns Creek in the valley between them.

History
Poe Paddy State Park is on the site of the former lumber town of Poe Mills. Poe Mills was part of the lumber boom that swept through the wooded mountains of Pennsylvania from the mid-to-late 19th and early 20th centuries. At its peak, Poe Mills had a population of over 300. Big Poe Creek was dammed to provide power for the mills and a railroad was built into the area to transport lumber.  This railway became a scenic route connecting the area with Milroy.

Poe Valley State Park and Poe Paddy State Park were built by the Civilian Conservation Corps during the Great Depression of the 1930s. The young men of the CCC also worked to clear the regrowing forests of brush to prevent forest fires. They constructed roads throughout the forests, built state park facilities, constructed bridges on the state roads, planted trees for reforestation, and cleaned streams.

Recreation
Penns Creek flows by the campground and is a trout fishery. Fly fishing is the most popular form of fishing at Poe Paddy State. It is noted for the Green Drake hatch that occurs in late spring. These flies are nearly the size of a small hummingbird and become the primary food source for the trout living in Penns Creek.

The rustic campground opens with trout season on the 2nd Friday in April and closes at the end of doe season in mid December. There are no showers or flush toilets at the campground. A sanitary dump station is provided at Poe Valley State Park. There are six tables and two pavilions available for visitors. During the winter the gravel roads are open to cross-country skiing and recreational snowmobile use.

Nearby state parks
The following state parks are within  of Poe Paddy State Park:
Bald Eagle State Park (Centre County)
Bucktail State Park Natural Area (Cameron and Clinton Counties)
Greenwood Furnace State Park (Huntingdon County)
McCalls Dam State Park (Centre County)
Penn-Roosevelt State Park (Centre County)
Poe Valley State Park (Centre County)
R. B. Winter State Park (Union County)
Reeds Gap State Park (Mifflin County)
Sand Bridge State Park (Union County)
Whipple Dam State Park (Huntingdon County)

References

External links

  

Poe Valley State Park
Protected areas established in 1938
Civilian Conservation Corps in Pennsylvania
Parks in Centre County, Pennsylvania
Protected areas of Centre County, Pennsylvania